Graphium deucalion, the yellow zebra, is a butterfly found in the Sunda Islands and the Moluccas that belongs to the swallowtail family. It is not known to be threatened.

Subspecies
G. d. deucalion (Sulawesi)
G. d. leucadion (Staudinger, 1884) (Ternate, Halmahera, Bachan)
G. d. marabuntana Detani, 1983 (Banggai)

References

 
Tsukada, E. & Nishiyama, Y. 1982. Papilionidae. In: Tsukada, E. (ed): Butterflies of the South East Asian Islands. Volume 1. Plapac Co., Tokyo

External links

Sulawesi Checklist
External images

Butterflies described in 1836
deucalion
Butterflies of Indonesia
Taxa named by Jean Baptiste Boisduval